Nil Desperandum Gulch is a valley in Nome Census Area, Alaska, in the United States.

Nil Desperandum Gulch derives its name from the Latin phrase Nil desperandum, meaning "never despair".

References

Landforms of Nome Census Area, Alaska
Valleys of Alaska
Landforms of the Seward Peninsula